Cody Melphy (born April 5, 1993) is a professional American rugby union player for the United States national rugby sevens team. Melphy was named to the team in February 2018 where he made his debut in the 2018 USA Sevens in Las Vegas. Melphy helped the U.S. to its first tournament win on home soil, the second-ever World Series tournament win in American history.

Youth

Cody Melphy was born and raised in Colorado. He grew up in Littleton where he graduated from Heritage High School. 2003–2010, Melphy played soccer for Real National in Colorado, coached by Joe Shaw. Captained the team to 4 state titles as a utility midfielder. Melphy played Varsity Soccer at Heritage High School under coach Adam Buseck. He was named to the All-Conference team. Melphy started playing rugby his senior year in high school for the Littleton Eagles Rugby Club under Ethan Pougnet and Charlie Riley.

Soccer 
Melphy attended Division II school Metropolitan State University of Denver from 2010 to 2011 under Ken Parsons. He started 19 of 20 games as a true freshman at right back in the defense. Melphy notched one assist and led the team with a +34 plus/minus rating (49 goals forced, 15 goals against) in 1,685 minutes played during the season.

Rugby career 

After high school he joined the Glendale Raptors men's rugby club where he played for the PRP from 2012 to 2015 under Andre Snyman. Melphy played collegiate rugby at Life University under Scott Lawrence from 2015 to 2017 where he studied Health Coaching and Business Management. He received Mid-South Player of the Month and Back of the year in 2016. In 2017 he was named a Scholz Finalist for D1A player of the year. Melphy received First team All-American awards in 7s and 15s in both 2016 and 2017. Melphy led Life University to a D1A National Championship in 2016. He also led the team to a 2017 D1A National Runner Up and a second-place finish at the Collegiate Rugby Championship, where he was named to the tournament Dream Team. During the summer of 2017, Melphy was a part of the Denver Barbarians men's 2nd-place finish at the Men's National Championships. He also captained the Collegiate All-Americans to a Bowl Championship in Serevi Rugbytown 7s.

Melphy now represents the United States national rugby sevens team as a professional athlete out of Chula Vista California, Elite Athlete Training Center. He debuted for the U.S. in March 2018 during the 2017-18 World Rugby Sevens Series.

In the Summer of 2019 Melphy Captained Team USA in the Pan American Games in Lima, Peru. The team received the Bronze Medal at the games. He was selected to represent the United States at the 2022 Rugby World Cup Sevens in Cape Town.

Army 
Specialist Melphy enlisted in the United States Army on October 10, 2017. He specializes as a Bridge Engineer Crewmember. Melphy became a part of the US Army World Class Athlete Program upon graduation from Delta co. 31st Engineer Battalion, his One Station Unit Training on February 9.

2018 and 2019 All Armed Forces Gold Medalist with US Army. 2019 All Armed Forces Dream team and Jon Snow MVP award winner. 
( https://rugbytown7s.com/ )

References 

1993 births
Living people
American rugby union players
Pan American Games medalists in rugby sevens
Pan American Games bronze medalists for the United States
Rugby sevens players at the 2019 Pan American Games
Medalists at the 2019 Pan American Games
Rugby sevens players at the 2020 Summer Olympics
Olympic rugby sevens players of the United States
U.S. Army World Class Athlete Program